Walton Glenn Eller III (born January 6, 1982) is an American trap shooter and five-time U.S. Olympic athlete (2000, 2004, 2008, 2012, 2016). At the 2008 Summer Olympics, he won the gold medal in men's double trap setting both an Olympic Record and a Final Olympic Record.

Eller was born in Houston, Texas, the son of Clara Anne (née Rackley) and Walton Glenn Eller, Jr. He attended James E. Taylor High School in Katy, a suburb of Houston. In 1996, Eller was the first American to win the British Open Sporting Clay junior title. In 1994, he was the U.S. National Sporting Clay subjunior champion.

Additionally, Glenn Eller is a Sergeant First Class in the United States Army. He is part of the U.S. Army Marksmanship Unit (USAMU), stationed at Ft. Benning, Georgia.

Olympic results

Records

References

External links

USA Shooting profile 
Army Olympic Team
Army Bio

1982 births
Living people
American male sport shooters
United States Army soldiers
United States Distinguished Marksman
People from Katy, Texas
Shooters at the 2000 Summer Olympics
Shooters at the 2004 Summer Olympics
Shooters at the 2008 Summer Olympics
Shooters at the 2011 Pan American Games
Olympic gold medalists for the United States in shooting
Trap and double trap shooters
Olympic medalists in shooting
Shooters at the 2012 Summer Olympics
Medalists at the 2008 Summer Olympics
Shooters at the 2015 Pan American Games
Shooters at the 2016 Summer Olympics
Pan American Games medalists in shooting
Pan American Games gold medalists for the United States
Sportspeople from Houston
Medalists at the 2011 Pan American Games
20th-century American people
21st-century American people